Pyotr Arsenievich Smirnov (January 9, 1831November 29, 1898) was a Russian businessman, who created Russia's leading pre-revolutionary vodka company, a predecessor of both Smirnoff and Smirnov companies. He was born a serf in Kayurovo, a small Russian village, on 9 January 1831, and rose to become one of the wealthiest men in Russia.

References

19th-century businesspeople from the Russian Empire
1831 births
1898 deaths